Mileage is a distance measured in miles.

Motor vehicles
 Distance traveled, typically as measured by an odometer, optionally from a milestone (UK)
 Fuel economy in automobiles, typically in miles per gallon (mpg) (US)
 Business mileage reimbursement rate, an optional standard mileage rate used in the United States for purposes of computing the allowable business deduction

Other uses
 "Mileage" (song), by Jung Yong-hwa and YDG, 2015
 Loyalty programs frequently list their points as "mileage" or "miles", earning their origins from airlines' frequent-flyer programs